Vatuwaqa River is a river in Suva, on the island of Viti Levu, Fiji. The industrial zone at the river mouth is an example of land reclamation.

See also
List of rivers of Fiji

References

GEOnet Names Server

Rivers of Viti Levu